In geometric optics, the paraxial approximation is a small-angle approximation used in Gaussian optics and ray tracing of light through an optical system (such as a lens).

A paraxial ray is a ray which makes a small angle (θ) to the optical axis of the system, and lies close to the axis throughout the system. Generally, this allows three important approximations (for θ in radians) for calculation of the ray's path, namely:

The paraxial approximation is used in Gaussian optics and first-order ray tracing. Ray transfer matrix analysis is one method that uses the approximation.

In some cases, the second-order approximation is also called "paraxial". The approximations above for sine and tangent do not change for the "second-order" paraxial approximation (the second term in their Taylor series expansion is zero), while for cosine the second order approximation is

The second-order approximation is accurate within 0.5% for angles under about 10°, but its inaccuracy grows significantly for larger angles. 

For larger angles it is often necessary to distinguish between meridional rays, which lie in a plane containing the optical axis, and sagittal rays, which do not.

References

External links 
 Paraxial Approximation and the Mirror by David Schurig, The Wolfram Demonstrations Project.

Geometrical optics